The Maico Mobil is an early touring motorcycle made by Maico between 1950 and 1958. Conceived and marketed as a “car on two wheels”, the Mobil had body panels that enclosed the drivetrain, protected its riders from the elements, and included an integral pair of panniers and a mount for a spare tyre.

Frame, body, and suspension

The Mobil had a tubular steel space frame on to which steel and aluminum body panels were bolted. A large front fairing enclosed the front wheel. Mounted on the fairing were a transparent plastic windscreen that wrapped around the handlebars, a dashboard through which the steering column protruded, and lower panels containing a glovebox and provision for a car radio to be installed. Mounted on the dashboard were the ignition switch, the speedometer, and the fuel filler cap; the fuel tank was mounted to the frame under the dashboard.

The rear bodywork included a pair of integral panniers and a rear mount for a spare wheel. The panniers were accessed by unlatching a panel under the pillion.

The Mobil used telescopic front forks and a rear swingarm.

Engine and transmission
The Mobil originally had a 150 cc single-cylinder two-stroke engine mounted between the dashboard and the rider's seat. Access panels on both sides of the Mobil could be removed to work on the engine. Power was transmitted through a three-speed transmission operated by a twist grip.

The capacity of the Mobil's engine was increased to 175 cc in 1953. An optional 200 cc became available in 1955, the same year that the three-speed twist-grip controlled transmission was replaced by a four-speed transmission controlled by a heel-and-toe pedal shifter.

See also
List of motorcycles of the 1950s
List of motorcycles by type of engine

References

Further reading
 

Maico motorcycles
Touring motorcycles
Vehicles introduced in 1951
Motorcycles introduced in the 1950s